Eduard von Steiger (2 July 1881, in Langnau im Emmental – 10 February 1962) was a Swiss politician and member of the Swiss Federal Council (1940–1951).

He studied law at the universities of Geneva, Leipzig and Berne. He became a member of the Conservative Party, was elected a Municipal Councilor of Berne and a Member of the Cantonal Parliament of Berne, all in 1914. He was President of the Bűrger Party of the town of Berne from 1922 to 1929. He was also President of the Parliamentary faction of the Bauern-Gewerbe and Bűrger Party (Peasant, Trades and Citizens Party).

In the Cantonal Parliament, he presided over the Commission of Justice, 1922-26 and over the State Economic Commission, 1929–34. He was President of the Parliamentary Council and elected to the Cantonal Executive Council of Berne in 1939.

He was elected to the Federal Council on 10 December 1940 and handed over office on 31 December 1951. He was affiliated to the Party of Farmers, Traders and Independents (BGB/PAI), now the Swiss People's Party.

During his time in office he held the Department of Justice and Police and was 51st President of the Confederation twice in 1945 and 1951.

External links

 

1881 births
1962 deaths
People from Emmental District
Swiss Calvinist and Reformed Christians
Party of Farmers, Traders and Independents politicians
Members of the Federal Council (Switzerland)
World War II political leaders
University of Geneva alumni
Leipzig University alumni
University of Bern alumni
Eduard